Stéphane Diarra (born 9 December 1998) is an Ivorian professional footballer who plays as a midfielder for Ligue 1 club Lorient. Born in Abidjan, Ivory Coast, he also holds French citizenship.

Career
Diarra made his senior debut for Évian during the 2015–16 Ligue 2 season, and then joined Rennes in July 2016. He spent the 2018–19 season on loan at Le Mans, helped them gain promotion to Ligue 2 via the play-offs, and joined them on a three-year contract in June 2019.

In summer 2020, Diarra moved to FC Lorient, newly promoted to Ligue 1, on a five-year contract. The transfer fee paid to Le Mans was reported as €3 million.

References

1998 births
Living people
Footballers from Abidjan
Ivorian footballers
French footballers
Association football midfielders
Thonon Evian Grand Genève F.C. players
Stade Rennais F.C. players
Le Mans FC players
FC Lorient players
Ligue 1 players
Ligue 2 players
Championnat National 2 players
Championnat National players
People with acquired French citizenship
Ivorian emigrants to France